Tirunelveli ranks high for the number of educational institutions in districts of Tamil Nadu.  The following is the list of educational institutions in the district.

Universities

Arts & Science Colleges

Law Colleges

B.ed Colleges

Community Colleges

Medical colleges

Para-Medical Colleges (Tenkasi & Ambasamudram )

Distance Education Institution

Computer Education Institutions

Engineering Colleges

References

Education in Tirunelveli district
Lists of universities and colleges in Tamil Nadu